The Kallamedu Formation is a Late Cretaceous (Maastrichtian) geologic formation located in India that forms part of the Ariyalur Group. Dinosaur remains and petrified wood samples are among the known fossils recovered from this formation.

Paleofauna 
 Abelisauridae indet. – "disassociated remains."
Bruhathkayosaurus matleyi – "ilium and ischium, femur, tibia, radius and part of a vertebra (specifically a platycoelous caudal centrum). Remains no longer exist."
Carnosauria indet.? – "fragmentary remains."
 Crocodilia indet. – "teeth."
Fusioolithus baghensis – "eggs."
Kurmademys kallamedensis – "nearly complete skull."
Notosuchia indet. - "related to Simosuchus."
 Sauropoda indet. – "fragmentary remains."
Stegosauria indet. – "dermal plate or misinterpreted sauropod bone."
Titanosauria indet. - "solitary egg."
Troodontidae indet. – "One isolated tooth (DUGF/52)."

References 

Geologic groups of Asia
Geologic formations of India
Upper Cretaceous Series of Asia
Maastrichtian Stage
Paleontology in India